Peter Parnell (born 1953) is an American Broadway and Off-Broadway playwright, television writer, and children's book author. Parnell is also Vice-President of the Dramatists Guild of America, the professional association of playwrights, composers, lyricists, and librettists.

Personal life
Parnell is gay and is married to the psychiatrist Justin Richardson.  They live in Manhattan with their daughter.

Plays 
 The Hunchback of Notre Dame - Disney Theatricals - music by Alan Menken, lyrics by Stephen Schwartz
 On a Clear Day You Can See Forever - St. James Theater, Broadway - 2011 - starring Harry Connick Jr., Jessie Mueller, and David Turner
 Trumpery - Atlantic Theatre Company - 2007 Trumpery received its European and British premiere in Oxford, UK during June 2014.
 QED - Lincoln Center Theater - starring Alan Alda - 2001
 The Cider House Rules, Part One, adapted from John Irving's novel - Atlantic Theatre Company, Mark Taper Forum, Seattle Rep
 The Cider House Rules, Part Two, Mark Taper Forum, Seattle Rep
 Flaubert's Latest - Playwrights Horizons - 1992
 Hyde in Hollywood - Playwrights Horizons - 1989
 An Imaginary Life - Playwrights Horizons - 1993
 Rise and Rise of Daniel Rocket - starring Thomas Hulce - Playwrights Horizons
 Romance Language - Playwrights Horizons - 1985
 Scooter Thomas Makes It to the Top of the World - National Playwrights Conference at the Eugene O'Neill Theater Center, 1977
 Sorrows of Stephen - The Public Theater - 1979

Television 
 The West Wing, Season One - Executive Story Editor - 1999–2000
 The West Wing, Season Two - Co-Producer - 2000–2001
 The Guardian, Season One - Producer - 2001–2002
 Inconceivable, Season One - Producer - 2005
 Six Degrees, Season One - Consulting Producer - 2006–2007
 BrainDead - Producer - 2017

Children's literature 
 And Tango Makes Three with Justin Richardson. The book tells the true story of two male penguins living in the Central Park Zoo who pair-bonded and together hatched a chick named Tango. The book has received numerous awards and was the single most challenged or banned book in the United States in the years 2006, 2007, 2008, and 2010. It remains one of the ten most banned books in several countries.
 Christian, the Hugging Lion, a children's book about the true story of Christian the lion.

Grants and awards 
NEA, Guggenheim, Ingram Merrill and Lecomte de Nouy foundations; the Fund for New American Plays, Kennedy Center,
American Theatre Critics' Association and Ovation awards for Best Play (for The Cider House Rules).
For ["And Tango Makes Three"]:
 American Library Association Notable Children's Book - 2006
 ASPCA's Henry Bergh Award - 2005
 Gustavus Myer Outstanding Book Award- 2006
 Nick Jr. Family Magazine Best Book of the Year - 2006
 Bank Street Best Book of the Year - 2006
 Cooperative Children's Book Council Choice, and CBC/NCSS Notable Social Studies Trade Book - 2006
 Lambda Literary Award finalist - 2006
 Sheffield Children's Book Award - shortlisted - 2008

References 

1953 births
Living people
20th-century American dramatists and playwrights
American children's writers
American television writers
American male television writers
American LGBT dramatists and playwrights
American gay writers
Dartmouth College alumni
American male dramatists and playwrights
20th-century American male writers